The Brazen Serpent is a 1618-1620 oil on canvas painting by Anthony van Dyck, now in the Museo del Prado in Madrid. It shows the Biblical story told in Numbers whereby Moses raised a bronze image of a serpent to the Israelites. It was first recorded in 1764, when it was chosen from Juan Kelly's collection in Madrid for Charles III of Spain by Anton Raphael Mengs.

Scientific examination of the work has shown that he combined wet and dry medium for the work

References

1620 paintings
Religious paintings by Anthony van Dyck
Paintings of the Museo del Prado by Flemish artists
Paintings depicting Moses
Snakes in art